Urban Appalachians are people from Appalachia who are living in metropolitan areas outside of the region. Because migration has been occurring for decades, most are not first generation migrants from the region but are long-term city dwellers.  People have been migrating from Appalachia to cities outside the region ever since many of these cities were founded.  It was not until the period following World War II, however, that large-scale migration to urban areas became common due to the decline of coal mining and the increase in industrial jobs available in the Midwest and Northeast. The migration of Appalachians is often known as the Hillbilly Highway.

Most of the Appalachian migrants settled in industrial centers in the Midwest and Northeast, with Detroit, Chicago, Cleveland, Cincinnati, Indianapolis, Toledo, Baltimore, Washington, D.C., and Pittsburgh being known for particularly large populations. Others moved to urban areas in the South, such as Atlanta and Louisville; other cities that have smaller but significant populations are Columbus, Fort Wayne, Lansing, Flint and Dayton.

In terms of national origin urban Appalachians reflect the varied heritage of the Appalachian region.  They are predominately Scots-Irish, English, Scottish, Irish and Welsh.  There were also large numbers of people with German, Central European, and Southern European ancestry, who were recruited to work in the coal and steel industries. A related phenomenon to the exodus of white Appalachians on the Hillbilly Highway is the Great Migration of black southerns, including some from Appalachia.

Urban Appalachians came from all areas of Appalachia.  Many came from coal camp villages in the Cumberland Plateau or Allegheny Mountains; others came from cities such as Knoxville,  Charleston, West Virginia, or the Huntington-Ashland area.  Some of these migrants had come from rural areas to the cities before moving on. Most, however, came from rural areas or small towns.

During the period of the nation's industrial expansion, the majority worked in factories, particularly in the automotive industry.  More recently, work in the service economy is becoming more predominant. The decline of industry in the Rust Belt starting in the 1970s had a negative effect on blue-collar workers of Appalachian backgrounds, and many returned home.  

Despite the Appalachian migrants' having come from different states and backgrounds, their shared history and the common experience of living in the hills, towns, valleys or  foothills of Appalachia gave them a sense of regional culture that some urban Appalachians celebrate today.

The Hillbilly Highway

Appalachians by the thousands came to the cities under a great variety of circumstances during the 19th and 20th centuries.  Early migrants came in trickles one family at a time over many decades.  They came in response to specific opportunities such as the opening of a factory.  They came during World War I and during the prosperous twenties.  They were sometimes recruited to work in a specific factory and, during World War II, thousands of Appalachians came to work in defense plants.  Thousands more left the region in response to layoffs in the coal industry.  When the mines shut down, some coal towns were entirely depopulated.  During the 1950s, special bus runs were made to transport laid off miners and their families to metropolitan areas.  It was during this 1940 to 1970 period that entire neighborhoods in the nation's cities became Appalachian, but the foundations of those communities were often laid much earlier in the century.  The period from 1940 to 1970 is often referred to as the "Hillbilly Highway".

Forming communities

For many Appalachians, factory work was what attracted them to urban areas, for firms such as Wright Aeronautical (later General Electric), Armco (later AK Steel), U.S. Shoe, General Motors, Chrysler, Frigidaire, Ford, Champion Paper, Nutone, National Cash Register (now NCR Corporation), Delco, and Newport Steel, to name a few. These and many other factories large and small drew people to the cities from Appalachia.  The location of these factories often determined the location of Appalachian neighborhoods.  Concentrations of low cost housing became temporary "ports of entry" for some families and long term homes for others. Layoffs, changeovers, plant shutdowns and long stretches of unemployment were common experiences.  Some faced discrimination in hiring or in their search for housing. Uptown, Chicago was a notable enclave of white Appalachians in the 1960s, earning the nickname "Hillbilly Heaven". For some white Appalachians, doors to good jobs or good neighborhoods were closed.  Banks did not always want to make mortgage loans to Appalachian families in certain areas, and insurance companies often refused them coverage through the practice of redlining.

Newcomers would often stay with relatives or friends until they got settled.  When the layoffs came people might have to go back to the mountains for a time or "double up" with relatives in the city.  Networks of family and friends were their main support.  Soon churches were organized, becoming an additional means of spiritual and material sustenance.  As neighborhoods became heavily Appalachian, churches, stores, bars, restaurants, and social clubs were established to serve this population.  Promoted by the radio and recording industries, urban Appalachian musicians and singers flourished,.  Today, Appalachian festivals in Dayton and Cincinnati draw over 40,000 people annually to celebrate their heritage.

As more members of a family migrated and more children were born, family networks with rural roots and urban branches became larger and stronger than before migration.  These family networks were flexible and often included non-kin in a network of mutual support, informal education and nurture.  Kinship systems and a set of experiences first in the mountains and now in working-class neighborhoods in the city are the core concepts in understanding urban Appalachian social structure.  And now that nearly every Appalachian family has members in both rural and urban areas, there is very little difference between rural and urban Appalachians.  The major differences among Appalachians are now most likely to appear along class lines.

Facing social problems and stereotypes

Some family networks were weakened or virtually destroyed by the moves from farm to coal camp to metropolitan area.  These weakened families became the concern of social agencies and church-sponsored outreach ministries.  Although relatively few of these families became welfare dependent, those few became the basis of the stereotype of the impoverished SAM or "southern Appalachian migrant."  Newspaper stories about welfare, crime and violence and "poverty posters" of large, poorly dressed Appalachian families caused many urban Appalachians to disassociate themselves from an open Appalachian identity.  Negative stereotypes have caused much suffering among people from Appalachia who have moved to the cities.

Thousands of families experienced some form of failure in their efforts to make new lives in the city.  Some returned to the Appalachian region, some stayed and experienced the worst of urban poverty. Most have fought the odds and have overcome, although many still await the opportunity to have good schools, good jobs and secure neighborhoods.  Advocacy and service organizations such as the Urban Appalachian Council were formed to respond to the needs of this population.

Even the strongest families, especially in the inner city, experienced a variety of hardships.  Children were ridiculed because of the way they talked, the way they dressed or because of where they lived.  Going to school was often just a matter of survival with little education occurring.  Unable to cope with the hostile environment of large and bureaucratic urban public schools, generations of inner city Appalachians have had to cope without the benefit of even a high school education.

Creating a neighborhood culture

Some researchers have seen urban Appalachians as an emerging ethnic group, forming group cohesion and identity in a fashion similar to earlier "urban villagers" arriving in America's cities.  Anthropologist Rhoda Halperin describes the culture of an urban Appalachian neighborhood in terms of a set of adaptations Appalachians have made to their circumstances.  She sees no distinction between rural Appalachian and urban migrant Appalachians and their descendants.  The features of community life produced by their adaptations include " . . . everyday practices - caring for children and the elderly, providing work, helping in times of crisis, granting favors, passing along information or lending support."  These practices, she says, are embedded in specific neighborhood structures that are old and enduring: the extended family, the church, and the neighborhood as a place that confers working class identity. Halperin identifies the strengths of an integrated working-class neighborhood as strong intergenerational ties, informal educational processes through which adults instruct the young, intricate patterns of exchange that provide food, shelter, and care of dependents, longevity of families in the neighborhood, householding (provisioning) practices, and the gifts of oratory, storytelling, and writing skills.

A balanced view of urban Appalachians needs to include the ravages that decades of industrialization, out-migration, deindustrialization, and deterioration of core city neighborhoods have wreaked on some.  But one should never stereotypically confuse the negative adaptations and pathologies that affect a minority of people from the mountains with all Appalachians.  Appalachian culture does not cause poverty, crime, or school failure.  Lack of good jobs, decent housing and good schools in safe neighborhoods have condemned millions of Americans of all backgrounds to lives on the margin of society in rural and urban enclaves.  Urban Appalachians resent having the poverty stereotypes applied to their group, and rightly so.  Every large group which has migrated to American cities has had similar experiences of facing put-downs, prejudice and outright discrimination.  Through individual and collective efforts most have been able to raise their socioeconomic status over time.  How long it takes the urban Appalachian poor to overcome the handicaps of poverty will depend in part on how the country responds to unemployment, underemployment, poor schooling and other urban ills.  The rest depends on urban Appalachians' ability to use the strengths of their heritage and adapt once again to economic shifts such as production jobs going overseas.

Making a contribution

Most urban Appalachians have benefited in many ways from the move to the city, both economically and socially.  Midwestern cities are home to thousands of practicing musicians, craftspeople, storytellers, poets, writers, and other artists.  Appalachians have contributed to the civic, economic and cultural life of their communities serving as ministers, elected officials, union leaders, and in thousands of small businesses.

For the most part urban Appalachians are not rich and famous. Rather, they were a key factor in the industrialization and build-up of infrastructure in the first half of the 20th century. They placed the welfare of their families and neighbors above their own advancement, moving up together or not at all. The influx of Appalachians helped to influence the life and culture of Midwestern and Northeastern American cities in the last half of this century.

See also

Hillbilly Highway
History of the Appalachian people in Baltimore
Upland South
Settlement schools
Social and economic stratification in Appalachia
Appalachia
Council of the Southern Mountains
Great Migration (African American)
Uptown, Chicago

References

Further reading

Please see "Selected Readings on Appalachian Migration and Urban Appalachians."   This compilation also contains references to newspapers, magazines, and serials featuring special issues on urban Appalachians, as well as related audio tapes, films, videos, and DVDs.

External links
The Urban Appalachian Council's website can be accessed at http://uacvoice.org/  This site has content on resources for professionals serving urban Appalachians, as well as relevant research and training information.
The Hillville (http://thehillville.com/) is an online magazine dedicated to the study of urban Appalachians

 
Society of Appalachia
History of Detroit
History of Chicago
Internal migrations in the United States
Southern United States